M. Chakrapani is an Indian politician. He is a member of the All India Anna Dravida Munnetra Kazhagam party. He was elected as a member of Tamil Nadu Legislative Assembly from Vanur Constituency in 2016 & May 2021.

Electoral performance

References 

Living people
People from Tamil Nadu
All India Anna Dravida Munnetra Kazhagam politicians
Tamil Nadu MLAs 2016–2021
Year of birth missing (living people)
Tamil Nadu MLAs 2021–2026
Tamil Nadu politicians